Lives of Style, is a broadcast television and newsmagazine show that features the "best of the best" celebrity style, fashion, beauty and lifestyle in the world. It airs on TV stations on the West Coast of the United States.

The show reports on New York, Paris, Milan, and London fashion weeks, the Academy Awards, the Golden Globes, the Emmys, Hollywood Premieres, Fashion's Night Out, Concours d’Elegance, Napa Wine Auction and the Cannes Film Festival.

The show features backstage and behind-the-scenes interviews with celebrities, TV personalities, designers, make-up artists, models, leaders and innovators and covers pop culture and lifestyle.

Elisabeth Laurence, the creator of Lives of Style, is also the host on the show which airs on KCAL 9 in Los Angeles and KRON 4 in San Francisco.

The show first aired in San Francisco, then Los Angeles, will launch in New York City and Miami in Winter 2012 and then go national in late 2012.

Celebrity Interviews 
Lives of Style's episodes features behind-the-scenes of fashion shows and events, as well as interviews with designers, make-up artists, fashion insiders, and celebrities. Elisabeth has also interviewed jewelers, luxury automobile representatives, as well as owners of impressive homes and estates.

The Last Word 
Lives of Style's The Last Word is a blog that provides news on fashion, celebrities, designers, and makeup. Lives of style enlisted Michael Canale to write a weekly column, sharing tips and expertise he uses for his celebrity clients.

The Last Word features articles from Relationship Expert Dr. Pat Allen. http://livesofstyle.com/thelastword/?p=6230 
Dr. Pat Allen talks about how to magnetize men, dating how-to's and do's and don't's.

References

External links
 Lives of Style
 The Last Word

2000s American television news shows
Fashion journalism
Fashion-themed television series
2012 American television series debuts
2010s American television news shows